Michael Charles Ragsdale (born December 15, 1940), was an American politician who was a member of the Oregon House of Representatives and Oregon State Senate. He was in the agribusiness.

References

1940 births
Living people
Republican Party members of the Oregon House of Representatives
People from La Grande, Oregon
Politicians from Salem, Oregon
People from Dundee, Oregon